Women of Today (Spanish: Mujeres de hoy) is a 1936 Mexican comedy drama film directed by Ramón Peón and starring Adriana Lamar, Ramón Pereda and Victoria Blanco.

Cast

References

Bibliography 
 Alfred Charles Richard. Censorship and Hollywood's Hispanic image: an interpretive filmography, 1936-1955. Greenwood Press, 1993.

External links 
 

1936 films
1936 comedy-drama films
1930s Spanish-language films
Films directed by Ramón Peón
Mexican black-and-white films
Mexican comedy-drama films
1930s Mexican films